Kerry Lee Rupp (born February 24, 1954) is an American college basketball coach who is currently an assistant coach at Detroit Mercy. Previously, Rupp was head coach at Louisiana Tech from 2007 to 2011.

Rupp graduated from Cyprus High School of Magna, Utah in 1972 and earned his B.A. in physical education from Southern Utah University in 1977.

Head coaching record

References

External links
 Louisiana Tech profile

1954 births
Living people
American men's basketball players
Basketball coaches from Utah
Basketball players from Utah
College men's basketball head coaches in the United States
High school basketball coaches in Utah
High school football coaches in Utah
Indiana Hoosiers men's basketball coaches
Louisiana Tech Bulldogs basketball coaches
Montana Grizzlies basketball coaches
Oregon State Beavers men's basketball coaches
People from Magna, Utah
Southern Utah Thunderbirds men's basketball players
UAB Blazers men's basketball coaches
Utah State Aggies men's basketball players
Utah Utes men's basketball coaches